Dean Saunders (born 1964) is a Welsh football player and manager. 

Dean Saunders may also refer to:

 Dean Saunders (singer) (born 1981), Dutch singer
 Dean Saunders (politician), American politician from Florida